The Adeonellidae is a family within the bryozoan order Cheilostomatida. Colonies are often upright bilaminar branches or sheets. The zooids generally have one or more adventitious avicularia on their frontal wall. Instead of ovicells the adeonids often possess enlarged polymorphs which brood the larvae internally.

The apparent similarity in characters to the family Adeonidae can makes their separation debatable.

References

Bryozoan families
Cheilostomatida
Extant Eocene first appearances